Mob is the second studio album by American rapper Babyface Ray. It was released through Wavy Gang and Empire Distribution on December 2, 2022. The album features guest appearances from Lil Durk, Blxst, Nija, Doe Boy, Samuel Shabazz, King Hendrick$, and GMO Stax. The album was supported by two singles: "Nice Guy" and "Spend It" (featuring Nija and Blxst).

In the United States, Mob entered at number 54 on the Billboard 200.

Critical reception

AllMusic gave it three out of five stars and noted that the album "is another lengthy set of tracks that demonstrates the Detroit rapper's stylistic range".

In a positive review, Pitchfork wrote, "What MOB proves is that good music and hard work can be their own self-fulfilling prophecy".

Track listing

Charts

References

2022 albums
Empire Distribution albums